The inaugural IRB Junior World Rugby Trophy was hosted by Chile in April 2008. The eight team competition for National men U'20 sides is the second tier of the IRB Junior World Championship, which replaced the U'19 & U'21 World Championships.

Pool Stage

Pool A 

{| class="wikitable" style="text-align: center;"
|-
!width="200"|Team
!width="20"|Pld
!width="20"|W
!width="20"|D
!width="20"|L
!width="20"|TF
!width="20"|PF
!width="20"|PA
!width="25"|+/-
!width="20"|BP
!width="20"|Pts
!width="200"|Status
|- 
|align=left| 
|3||3||0||0||9||67||19||+48||1||13||Into final
|- 
|align=left| 
|3||2||0||1||12||77||47||+30||2||10||Into play-off for 3rd place
|- 
|align=left| 
|3||1||0||2||7||57||62||−5||2||6||Into play-off for 5th place
|-
|align=left| 
|3||0||0||3||3||31||104||−73||0||0||Into play-off for 7th place
|}

Pool B 

{| class="wikitable" style="text-align: center;"
|-
!width="200"|Team
!width="20"|Pld
!width="20"|W
!width="20"|D
!width="20"|L
!width="20"|TF
!width="20"|PF
!width="20"|PA
!width="25"|+/-
!width="20"|BP
!width="20"|Pts
!width="200"|Status
|- 
|align=left| 
|3||3||0||0||24||169||24||+145||2||14||Into final
|- 
|align=left| 
|3||2||0||1||23||156||54||+102||3||11||Into play-off for 3rd place
|- 
|align=left| 
|3||1||0||2||15||94||134||−40||2||6||Into play-off for 5th place
|-
|align=left| 
|3||0||0||3||2||20||227||−207||0||0||Into play-off for 7th place
|}

Play-offs

7th-place play-off

5th-place play-off

3rd-place play-off

Final

See also 
 2008 IRB Junior World Championship

2008
2008 rugby union tournaments for national teams
International rugby union competitions hosted by Chile
Youth sport in Chile
Sport in Santiago
2008 in Chilean sport
2008 in youth sport